His Young Wife is a 1945 Italian comedy film directed by Mario Soldati. It was entered into the 1946 Cannes Film Festival.

Cast
 Carlo Campanini - Monsù Ignazio Travet
 Vera Carmi - Madama Rosa Travet
 Paola Veneroni - Marianin Travet
 Pierluigi Veraldo - Carluccio Travet (as Pier Luigi Verando)
 Laura Gore - Brigida
 Gino Cervi - Il commandatore Francesco Battilocchio
 Luigi Pavese - Il capo sezione
 Mario Siletti - Môtôn
 Michele Malaspina - Rusca
 Gianni Agus - Velan
 Domenico Gambino - Monsù Giachetta
 Enrico Effernelli - Paôlin
 Alberto Sordi - Camillo Barbarotti
 Carlo Mazzarella - Paglieri, il notaio
 Felice Minotti - Giuan, il primo usciere

References

External links

1945 films
1945 comedy films
Italian comedy films
Films scored by Nino Rota
1940s Italian-language films
Films set in Turin
Italian black-and-white films
Films directed by Mario Soldati
1940s Italian films